"Bad" is a song by American hip hop recording artist Wale. It was released on February 5, 2013, as the first single from his third studio album The Gifted (2013). The song, produced by Kelson Camp, features a guest appearance from Tiara Thomas. "Bad" has so far peaked at number 21 on the US Billboard Hot 100, making it Wale's third top 40 entry after "No Hands" and "Lotus Flower Bomb", and becoming his highest-charting single as a lead artist. It also became Thomas' first top 40 entry.

Background
The song was originally released on December 24, 2012, as track 6 on Wale's mixtape Folarin, but would later appear on his album The Gifted.

Music video
Wale spoke about the concept of the video in an interview saying, "It was an amazing experience because it felt like a real movie, The concept of the video is about a girl. She’s trying to find herself by means of intimacy. She hasn’t really discovered what she wants out of love or lust. It’s almost a true story about some of the girls I’ve been with or courted." It features a cameo from Rick Ross. The music video was directed by Alexandre Moors and premiered on March 20, 2013, on 106 & Park.

Track listing

Release history

Remix

"Bad" was officially remixed with the inclusion of guest vocals of Barbadian recording artist Rihanna. The song was digitally released via the iTunes Store on June 3, 2013. It also appeared on Wale's third studio album, The Gifted. On May 10, 2013, R&B singer Rihanna posted a photo of herself and Wale working in a studio via Instagram. It was later confirmed that the pair had recorded a remix of the single.

Composition

As noted by MTV, the remix starts with moody synth keys before the familiar "bed springs" squeak, which appeared in the original track, lead to the infidelity-laced hook. Wale and Rihanna also trade rap bars: "Bad girls ain't no good and the good girls ain't no fun," he spits before she answers: "And the bad girls want a real nigga." Rihanna tweaks Tiara Thomas' original section into her own, adding a "touch of her seductive island accent". "Is it bad that, I never made love. I never did it, but I sure know how to fuck," she sings tragically. Wale and Rihanna play off one another on the track and voice their inner turmoil involving the opposite sex. Rihanna sings (also later raps) in response to Wale's laments about a difficult relationship and praises of hot sex on the "bed, floor, couch, more." It uses a whole new instrumental track that refers to Rihanna's song "Loveeeeeee Song". Rihanna raps with Wale with similar lyrics to the original song.

Critical reception
Rob Markman of MTV gave the remix a positive review saying, "These days, most rap remixes usually consists of a loose collection of MCs collaborating over pre-existing instrumentals, but for the remix to his hit single 'Bad', Wale had the good sense to do something different. Instead of rounding up a predictable cast of rap characters, Folarin retooled the beat and then added Rihanna to the remix."

Track listing
 Digital single

Release history

Charts

Weekly charts

Year-end charts

Certifications

References

2012 songs
2013 singles
Wale (rapper) songs
Atlantic Records singles
Maybach Music Group singles
Songs written by Tiara Thomas
Songs written by Wale (rapper)
Rihanna songs